"Here I Go Again" is a song by British band the Hollies, released as a single in May 1964.

Background and release
"Here I Go Again" was written by Mort Shuman and Clive Westlake. It was recorded on 13 April 1964 at EMI Studios and released as a single a month later by Parlophone with the B-side "Baby That's All", written by the Hollies' Allan Clarke, Tony Hicks and Graham Nash under the pseudonym Chester Mann. The US release by Imperial Records in June 1964 saw it paired with a different B-side, a cover of Little Richard's "Lucille".

It was their first original single, with their previous four singles having all been covers. An EP including the song was later released in October 1964, also entitled Here I Go Again. In the US, an album entitled Here I Go Again was released in June 1964 and was largely based on the UK album Stay with the Hollies.

The single performed well in the UK, continuing their success there, and peaked at number 4 on the Record Retailer chart. It performed particularly well on the Mersey Beat chart, topping it in the final week of June 1964. However, in the US, "Here I Go Again" failed to chart on the Billboard Hot 100 or Cash Box Top 100 charts, instead bubbling under on both.

Reviewed in Record Mirror, "Here I Go Again" was described as "[having] a "Just One Look" flavour, and there's a grow-on-you melody on the vibrant beat ballad. Maybe not as powerful as their last few, but a huge hit on their name".

Track listings
7": Parlophone / R 5137
 "Here I Go Again" – 2:19
 "Baby That's All" – 2:16

7": Imperial / 66044 (US)
 "Here I Go Again" – 2:17
 "Lucille" – 2:20

Charts

References

1964 singles
The Hollies songs
Songs with music by Mort Shuman
Parlophone singles
Imperial Records singles
1964 songs
Songs written by Clive Westlake